The Great American Outdoors Act (H.R. 1957) is a piece of legislation passed by the United States Congress, signed by President Donald J. Trump, and activated into Public Law (Public Law No. 116-152) in 2020. It has two major components: fully and permanently fund the Land and Water Conservation Fund (LWCF) at $900 million per year, and providing $9.5 billion over five years ($1.9 billion annually) to address a maintenance backlog at American national parks. The Associated Press wrote that it would be "the most significant conservation legislation enacted in nearly half a century."

However, on November 9, 2020, Trump's Interior Secretary David Bernhardt implemented a rule which would give local authorities a veto over LWCF acquisitions, which critics said would significantly weaken the impact of the legislation. The Trump administration also proposed significantly fewer projects than the legislation called for. On February 11, 2021, the Biden administration reverted the Trump administration's rule.

Legislative history 

The bill was first introduced in the House of Representatives by John Lewis (D-GA) as the Taxpayer First Act of 2019 on March 28, 2019. After inserting amendments, Senator Cory Gardner (R–CO) reintroduced the bill in the Senate on March 9, 2020, during the 116th United States Congress as the Great American Outdoors Act. On June 9, it passed a procedural vote 80–17 and moved to full consideration before the Senate.

The bill passed the Senate on June 17 by a vote of 73–25. On July 22, the amended bill was passed by the House on a bipartisan vote of 310–107.

Support and opposition 
Considered bipartisan in nature for the 116th Congress, the bill attracted 59 co-sponsors, both Democrats and Republicans. President Trump expressed a willingness to sign the act after being shown an impressive picture of land within Black Canyon of the Gunnison National Park protected by LWCF funds, despite previously opposing the LWCF. The LWCF, first established in 1965, had been made permanent by the 2019 John D. Dingell Jr. Conservation, Management, and Recreation Act but had not been permanently funded at that time.

The measure was supported by conservation organizations such as The Nature Conservancy, the National Wildlife Federation, and the League of Conservation Voters, while some animal husbandry and mining groups opposed it. The New York Times reported that some Democrats believed that Mitch McConnell, the Senate Majority Leader, only allowed debate on the bill in order to support the 2020 re-election efforts of Gardner and Steve Daines (R–MT).

Notes

References 

Acts of the 116th United States Congress
Nature conservation in the United States
United States federal public land legislation